François Marie Daudin (29 August 1776 in Paris – 30 November 1803 in Paris) was a French zoologist.

With legs paralyzed by childhood disease, he studied physics and natural history, but ended up being devoted to the latter.

Daudin wrote  (Complete and Elementary Treatise of Ornithology) in 1799–1800.  It was one of the first modern handbooks of ornithology, combining Linnean binomial nomenclature with the anatomical and physiological descriptions of Buffon. While an excellent beginning, it was never completed.

In 1800, he also published Recueil de mémoires et de notes sur des espèces inédites ou peu connues de mollusques, de vers et de zoophytes (Collection of memories and notes on new or little-known species of molluscs, worms and zoophytes).

Daudin found his greatest success in herpetology.  He published Histoire naturelle des reinettes, des grenouilles et des crapauds (Natural history of tree frogs, frogs and toads) in 1802, and Histoire naturelle, générale et particulière des reptiles (Natural History of Reptiles) (8 volumes) in 1802–1803.  This latter work contained descriptions of 517 species, many for the first time, based on examining over 1100 specimens.

He was assisted by his wife "Adèle" (Adélaïde Geneviève de Grégoire de Saint-Sauveur, born 1774), who drew the illustrations. Although his books were commercial failures the couple did not live in poverty, due to the family fortune.  She died of tuberculosis in late 1803, and he followed shortly thereafter, also of tuberculosis, not yet 30 years old.

Taxonomic credits
Despite his short life, Daudin made a lasting contribution to taxonomy.

Birds
 Accipiter minullus, little sparrowhawk
 Accipiter tachiro, African goshawk
 Anhinga rufa, African darter
 Anthochaera paradoxa, yellow wattlebird
 Ciccaba huhula, black-banded owl
 Circus ranivorus, African marsh harrier
 Coracias naevius, Purple roller
 Corvus leucognaphalus, white-necked crow
 Crypsirina temia, black racket-tailed treepie
 Falco chicquera, red-necked falcon
 Falco rufigularis, bat falcon
 Falco tinnunculus rupicolus, rock kestrel
 Gymnasio nudipes, Puerto Rican owl
 Haliaeetus vocifer, African fish eagle
 Lamprotornis ornatus, Principe glossy-starling
 Lophaetus occipitalis, long-crested eagle
 Lophostrix cristata, crested owl
 Loxigilla portoricensis, Puerto Rican bullfinch
 Malimbus malimbicus, crested malimbe
 Melanerpes portoricensis, Puerto Rican woodpecker
 Melierax gabar, Gabar goshawk
 Morphnus guianensis, crested eagle
 Onychognathus nabouroup, pale-winged starling
 Paradisaea rubra, red bird-of-paradise
 Phaethon lepturus, white-tailed tropicbird
 Ploceus baglafecht, baglafecht weaver
 Polemaetus bellicosus, martial eagle
 Saltator fuliginosus, black-throated grosbeak
 Seleucidis melanoleucus, twelve-wired bird-of-paradise
 Spizaetus ornatus, ornate hawk eagle
 Sporopipes frontalis, speckle-fronted weaver
 Sturnus melanopterus, black-winged starling
 Terathopius ecaudatus, bateleur

Reptiles
 Genus Acanthophis, death adders
 Genus Bungarus, kraits
 Genus Corallus, tree boas
 Genus Eryx, Old World sand boas
 Genus Lachesis, bushmasters
 Genus Pelamis, yellow-bellied sea snakes
 Genus Python, pythons
 Genus Ophisaurus, glass lizards
 Genus Takydromus, Oriental racers
 Alligator mississippiensis, American alligator
 Anolis auratus, anole, no common name
 Anolis punctatus, Amazon green anole
 Atretium schistosum, split keelback (snake)
 Bitis cornuta, many-horned adder
 Boa constrictor imperator, common northern boa
 Caiman latirostris, broad-snouted caiman
 Caiman yacare, yacare caiman
 Clelia clelia, black mussurana
 Coronella girondica, southern smooth snake
 Cuora amboinensis amboinensis, Malayan box turtle
 Dendrelaphis tristis, bronzeback (snake)
 Disteira nigrocincta, no common name, venomous sea snake
 Dracaena guianensis, caiman lizard
 Elaphe helena, trinket snake
 Enhydrina schistosa, beaked sea snake
 Eumeces schneiderii, Schneider's skink
 Gopherus polyphemus, Florida gopher tortoise
 Hemidactylus triedrus, termite hill gecko
 Hydrophis cyanocinctus, annulated sea snake
 Hydrophis mamillaris, Bombay sea snake
 Hydrophis obscurus, Russell's sea snake
 Kentropyx striata, striped Kentropyx (lizard)
 Lacerta bilineata, western green lizard
 Lycodon capucinus, common wolf snake
 Lycodon nympha, common bridal snake
 Micrurus psyches, carib coral snake
 Oxybelis fulgidus, green vine snake
 Pituophis melanoleucus, pine snake
 Rafetus euphraticus, Euphrates softshell turtle
 Ramphotyphlops braminus, brahminy blind snake
 Rhinoclemmys punctularia, spot-legged turtle
 Sceloporus undulatus undulatus, eastern fence lizard
 Scelotes gronovii, Gronovi's dwarf burrowing skink
 Siphlophis compressus, red vine snake
 Takydromus sexlineatus, Asian grass lizard
 Teius teyou, no common name, family Teiidae (whiptails)
 Timon lepidus, ocellated lizard
 Tripanurgos compressus, mapepire de fe (snake)
 Varanus albigularis, rock monitor
 Varanus bengalensis, Bengal monitor
 Varanus griseus, desert monitor
 Varanus indicus, mangrove monitor
 Xenoxybelis argenteus, green striped vine snake

Amphibians
 Caecilia albiventris, no common name, Caecilian
 Cryptobranchus alleganiensis, hellbender (salamander)
 Elachistocleis surinamensis, sapito apuntado de Surinam
 Hoplobatrachus tigerinus, Indian bullfrog
 Hyla surinamensis (nomen dubium)
 Pelodytes punctatus, common parsley frog
 Phyllomedusa hypochondrialis, rana lemur de flancos rojos
 Pseudacris ocularis, little grass frog
 Sphaenorhynchus lacteus, rana fantasma (tree frog)
 Xenopus laevis, African clawed frog

Molluscs
 Genus Spiroglyptus, wormsnails, family Vermetidae
 Genus Vermetus, wormsnails, family Vermetidae

Annelids
 Genus Spirorbis, hard tube worms

Taxa named in Daudin's honour
 Aldabrachelys gigantea daudinii''  – Daudin's giant tortoise (extinct, Seychelles)

References

External links
Zoologica Göttingen State and University Library

French zoologists
French taxonomists
1776 births
1803 deaths
French herpetologists
French ornithologists
18th-century French zoologists
19th-century French zoologists
Scientists from Paris